Rote Rosen may refer to:

"Rote Rosen", poem by Theodor Storm
"Rote Rosen", TV series
"Rote Rosen", song from list of compositions by Richard Strauss
"Rote Rosen", song by Freddy Breck